"Gambling Man" is the first single from five-piece British-Irish doo-wop boy band The Overtones to be released from their debut album, Good Ol' Fashioned Love. The single was released in the United Kingdom as a digital download on 8 October 2010.

Music video
A music video to accompany the release of "Gambling Man" was first released onto YouTube on 27 September 2010; at a total length of three minutes and thirty-three seconds. The Video also featured British actor Mel Mills as "Mr Big" in a rare video appearance along with his private vehicle, a 30 year old Jaguar XJS 5.3 H.E V12 hand built by Paul Banham.

Track listing

Chart performance

Release history

References

External links
 The Overtones Official Website

2010 singles
2010 songs
Warner Music Group singles
Songs written by Nick Southwood